Kadish Luz (10 January 1895 – 4 December 1972) was an Israeli politician who served as Minister of Agriculture between 1955 and 1959 and Speaker of the Knesset from 1959 and 1969.

Biography
Luz was born Kadish Luzinski in 1895 in Bobruysk in the Russian Empire (today in Belarus) to Zvi Luzinski and Esther Seldovitch. He served in the Russian Army during World War I and was a founder of the Hebrew Soldier Association and the HeHalutz movement. He studied in a polytechnic in Germany, at the Economics Institute in Saint Petersburg, and the Agricultural Institute of Odessa University. 

He made aliyah to Palestine in 1920 and initially worked as an agricultural labourer in Kiryat Anavim and Be'er Tuvia. The following year he joined kibbutz Degania Bet, and eventually became a member of the kibbutz union's secretariat between 1949 and 1951. He was also amongst the leaders of the Histadrut, serving on its comptroller committee between 1935 and 1940. Between 1941 and 1942 he was on the secretariat of Tel Aviv's workers' council.

He was elected to the Knesset in 1951 on Mapai's list, and was appointed Minister of Agriculture by David Ben-Gurion in 1955. After leaving the cabinet in 1959, he became Speaker of the Knesset, serving for 10 years, the second longest term after Yosef Sprinzak.

Following the sudden death of Yitzhak Ben-Zvi on 23 April 1963, he served as acting President of the state, until the election of Zalman Shazar on 21 May 1963.

He died in 1972 in Degania Bet.

References

External links

 

1895 births
1972 deaths
Israeli Ashkenazi Jews
Jews from the Russian Empire
People from Babruysk
Military personnel of the Russian Empire
Odesa University alumni
Soviet emigrants to Mandatory Palestine
Ashkenazi Jews in Mandatory Palestine
Alignment (Israel) politicians
Israeli Labor Party politicians
Mapai politicians
Members of the 2nd Knesset (1951–1955)
Members of the 3rd Knesset (1955–1959)
Members of the 4th Knesset (1959–1961)
Members of the 5th Knesset (1961–1965)
Members of the 6th Knesset (1965–1969)
Speakers of the Knesset
Ministers of Agriculture of Israel
People from Degania Bet